SA Parliament may refer to:
 Parliament of Saudi Arabia, known as the Consultative Assembly of Saudi Arabia
 Parliament of South Africa
 Parliament of South Australia